Eric Londery Griffin (born May 26, 1990) is an American professional basketball player for Hapoel Eilat of the Israeli Basketball Premier League. He played college basketball for Hiwassee College, Garden City CC, and Campbell University before playing professionally in Italy, Puerto Rico, Venezuela, the United Arab Emirates, Dominican Republic, Israel, Poland, Australia and Greece.

High school and college career
Griffin attended Maynard Evans High School in Orlando, Florida, before transferring to Boone High School for his senior year after being cut multiple times from the basketball team at Evans. At Boone, he met head coach and former LSU guard Willie Anderson, who recognized Griffin's freakish athleticism and unrelenting hunger for greatness. Anderson was the first one to give Griffin a chance, and he didn't disappoint.

Following a solid first year of organized basketball, Griffin went on to play for Hiwassee Community College in Tennessee, where he averaged 16 points, six rebounds and two blocks per game in 2008–09. But when the small junior college lost its accreditation in 2009, Griffin was forced to move on. He transferred to Garden City Community College in Kansas, and in 2009–10, he played 32 games, averaging 8.1 points, 6.5 rebounds, and 1.6 blocks per game.

In 2010, Griffin transferred to Campbell University. In his junior season, he scored in double figures 20 times, had five double-digit rebounding nights and set a school single-season Division I era (since 1977–78) record with 61 blocked shots. In 29 games (22 starts), he averaged 13.2 points, 6.9 rebounds, 1.0 assists, 1.7 steals and 2.1 blocks in 28.1 minutes per game.

In his senior season, Griffin was named to the 2012 All-Big South Conference first team. In his two-year career at Campbell, he finished with the school's highest career field goal percentage (.559) and ranks third on the school's all-time blocks list with 134 rejections. In 31 games, he averaged 15.7 points, 8.6 rebounds, 1.5 assists and 2.4 blocks in 30.3 minutes per game.

Professional career

2012–13 season
After going undrafted in the 2012 NBA draft, Griffin joined the Los Angeles Lakers for the 2012 NBA Summer League. On July 27, 2012, he signed with Fileni BPA Jesi of Italy for the 2012–13 season. In 28 games for Fileni, he averaged 17.5 points, 7.1 rebounds, 1.2 assists, 1.8 steals and 1.3 blocks per game.

2013–14 season
In July 2013, Griffin joined the Miami Heat for the 2013 NBA Summer League. On September 10, 2013, he signed with the Heat, but was later waived on October 26 after appearing in seven preseason games.

In December 2013, Griffin signed with Leones de Ponce of Puerto Rico for the 2014 Americas League. In February 2014, he signed with Guaros de Lara of Venezuela for the rest of the 2014 LPB season. He left Guaros de Lara the following month after appearing in just six games. He later signed with Indios de San Francisco de Macorís of the Liga Nacional de Baloncesto in May. In 17 games for Indios, he averaged 13.1 points, 4.3 rebounds and 1.1 assists and 1.3 blocks per game.

2014–15 season
In July 2014, Griffin joined the Dallas Mavericks for the 2014 NBA Summer League. On July 18, he signed with the Mavericks, but was later waived on October 21 after appearing in two preseason games. On November 3, 2014, he was acquired by the Texas Legends of the NBA Development League as an affiliate player of the Mavericks. On February 4, 2015, he was named to the Futures All-Star team for the 2015 NBA D-League All-Star Game. In 49 games for Texas in 2014–15, he averaged 19.0 points, 6.6 rebounds, 1.9 assists, 1.3 steals and 2.4 blocks per game.

On April 15, 2015, Griffin returned to Leones de Ponce, signing with them for the rest of the 2015 BSN season. In 14 games for Leones, he averaged 10.1 points, 3.8 rebounds, 1.3 assists and 1.0 blocks per game.

2015–16 season
In July 2015, Griffin joined the Los Angeles Clippers for the Orlando Summer League and the Cleveland Cavaliers for the Las Vegas Summer League. He signed with the Detroit Pistons on September 28, 2015, but was waived on October 7.

On November 10, 2015, Griffin signed with UAE basketball club Al-Nasr Dubai SC. His final game for Al-Nasr came on April 16, 2016.

2016–17 season
On August 18, 2016, Griffin signed with Hapoel Gilboa Galil of the Israeli Basketball Premier League. On April 18, 2017, Griffin participated in the Israeli League All-Star Game and won the Slam Dunk Contest during the same event. Griffin played 33 games for Gilboa Galil and averaged 14.9 points, 7.1 rebounds, 1.6 assists, 1.0 steals and 1.8 blocks per game.

2017–18 season
On July 3, 2017, Griffin signed with Pallacanestro Cantù of the Serie A. Prior to joining Cantù, he played for the Utah Jazz's Summer League team in both Utah and Las Vegas. After impressing during the Summer League, he opted out of his deal with Cantù and signed a two-way contract with the Jazz on July 20, 2017. He played 19 games for the Utah's G League affiliate, the Salt Lake City Stars, before being waived by the Jazz on December 21, 2017. He did not appear in a game for the Jazz during his time with them.

On January 26, 2018, Griffin returned to Israel for a second stint, signing with Hapoel Eilat for the rest of the season. On February 4, 2018, he made his debut in a 72–84 loss to Hapoel Jerusalem, recording 13 points and 8 rebounds off the bench. On June 3, 2018, Griffin recorded a season-high 30 points, shooting 10-of-13 from the field, along with 7 rebounds and 2 assists in an 81–87 playoff loss to Hapoel Holon.

2018–19 season
On July 23, 2018, Griffin signed with the Italian club Pallacanestro Reggiana. On December 13, he parted ways with Reggiana after appearing in six games. On January 1, 2019, Griffin signed with the Polish team Stelmet Zielona Gora for the rest of the season. However, on January 16, 2019, Griffin parted ways with Zielona Góra after appearing in two games.

On January 17, 2019, Griffin returned to Israel for a third stint, signing with Ironi Nahariya for the rest of the season. Two days later, he made his debut in a 93–103 loss to Ironi Nes Ziona, recording 17 points, eight rebounds and three blocks off the bench.

2019–20 season
On June 24, 2019, Griffin signed with the Adelaide 36ers for the 2019–20 NBL season. He averaged 14 points, 6.2 rebounds and 1.2 blocks per game.

In March 2020, Griffin had a three-game stint in Puerto Rico for Leones de Ponce.

2020–21 season
On September 5, 2020, Griffin signed with Hapoel Be'er Sheva of the Israeli Premier League. In 25 games, he recorded 17.9 points, 6.8 rebounds, 1.5 assists and 1.0 blocks per game.

2021–22 season
On August 23, 2021, Griffin signed a two-year deal with AEK Athens of the Greek Basket League and the Basketball Champions League. In 15 league games, he averaged 10 points, 4.3 rebounds, 0.9 assists, 0.5 steals and 1 block, playing around 27 minutes per contest. His contract was terminated on July 1, 2022.

2022–23 season
On August 4, 2022, Griffin signed with Hapoel Eilat of the Israeli Basketball Premier League, returning to the team for a second stint.

Personal life
Griffin is the son of James Martin and Alma Bracy, and has three siblings: Bacarrai Bracy, Damien King and Adrian King.

In June 2016, the State of Florida dropped a two-month-old charge of attempted first degree murder with a firearm against Griffin. Griffin and a friend had been arrested in late April 2016 for an Orlando-area shooting that involved 24-year-old Treavor Glover. The Florida State Attorney's Office determined that it was not suitable for prosecution, finding that Griffin was falsely identified (the victim described the man who shot him as being "around 6-foot to 6-2"; Griffin is 6-9) while determining that Griffin had an alibi (his alarm system was on the night of the shooting until the following morning, and a motion detector picked him up as movement in a hallway).

References

External links

NBA D-League profile
Campbell Fighting Camels bio

1990 births
Living people
Adelaide 36ers players
AEK B.C. players
American expatriate basketball people in Australia
American expatriate basketball people in the Dominican Republic
American expatriate basketball people in Greece
American expatriate basketball people in Israel
American expatriate basketball people in Italy
American expatriate basketball people in Poland
American expatriate basketball people in the United Arab Emirates
American expatriate basketball people in Venezuela
American men's basketball players
Basket Zielona Góra players
Basketball players from Orlando, Florida
Campbell Fighting Camels basketball players
Garden City Broncbusters men's basketball players
Guaros de Lara (basketball) players
Hapoel Be'er Sheva B.C. players
Hapoel Eilat basketball players
Hapoel Gilboa Galil Elyon players
Ironi Nahariya players
Hiwassee Tigers men's basketball players
Lega Basket Serie A players
Leones de Ponce basketball players
Pallacanestro Reggiana players
Power forwards (basketball)
Salt Lake City Stars players
Texas Legends players
William R. Boone High School alumni